Chen Ao (born 17 July 2000) is a Chinese footballer currently playing as a midfielder for China League One side Qingdao Youth Island.

Club career
At the beginning of the 2019 Chinese Super League season Chen Ao was loaned from Hebei China Fortune to fellow top tier club Wuhan Zall where he would make his senior debut on 1 May 2019 in a Chinese FA Cup game against Shanghai SIPG that ended in a 3-1 defeat.

Career statistics

Club

References

External links

2000 births
Living people
Chinese footballers
China youth international footballers
China under-20 international footballers
Association football midfielders
Chinese Super League players
Hebei F.C. players
Wuhan F.C. players